Education reform is the name given to the goal of changing public education. The meaning and education methods have changed through debates over what content or experiences result in an educated individual or an educated society. Historically, the motivations for reform have not reflected the current needs of society. A consistent theme of reform includes the idea that large systematic changes to educational standards will produce social returns in citizens' health, wealth, and well-being.

As part of the broader social and political processes, the term education reform refers to the chronology of significant, systematic revisions made to amend the educational legislation, standards, methodology, and policy affecting a nation's public school system to reflect the needs and values of contemporary society.18th century, classical education instruction from an in-home personal tutor, hired at the family's expense, was primarily a privilege for children from wealthy families. Innovations such as encyclopedias, public libraries, and grammar schools all aimed to relieve some of the financial burden associated with the expenses of the classical education model. Motivations during the Victorian era emphasized the importance of self-improvement. Victorian education focused on teaching commercially valuable topics, such as modern languages and mathematics, rather than classical liberal arts subjects, such as Latin, art, and history.

Motivations for education reformists like Horace Mann and his proponents focused on making schooling more accessible and developing a robust state-supported common school system. John Dewey, an early 20th-century reformer, focused on improving society by advocating for a scientific, pragmatic, or democratic principle-based curriculum. Whereas Maria Montessori incorporated humanistic motivations to "meet the needs of the child". In historic Prussia, a motivation to foster national unity led to formal education concentrated on teaching national language literacy to young children, resulting in Kindergarten.

The history of educational pedagogy in the United States has ranged from teaching literacy and proficiency of religious doctrine to establishing cultural literacy, assimilating immigrants into a democratic society, producing a skilled labor force for the industrialized workplace, preparing students for careers, and competing in a global marketplace. Education inequality is also a motivation for education reform, seeking to address problems of a community.

Motivations for education reform 
Education reform, in general, implies a continual effort to modify and improve the institution of education. Over time, as the needs and values of society change, attitudes towards public education change. As a social institution, education plays an integral role in the process of socialization. "Socialization is broadly composed of distinct inter- and intra-generational processes. Both involve the harmonization of an individual's attitudes and behaviors with that of their socio-cultural milieu." Educational matrices mean to reinforce those socially acceptable informal and formal norms, values, and beliefs that individuals need to learn in order to be accepted as good, functioning, and productive members of their society. Education reform is the process of constantly renegotiating and restructuring the educational standards to reflect the ever-evolving contemporary ideals of social, economic, and political culture. Reforms can be based on bringing education into alignment with a society's core values. Reforms that attempt to change a society's core values can connect alternative education initiatives with a network of other alternative institutions.

Education reform has been pursued for a variety of specific reasons, but generally most reforms aim at redressing some societal ills, such as poverty-, gender-, or class-based inequities, or perceived ineffectiveness. Current education trends in the United States represent multiple achievement gaps across ethnicities, income levels, and geographies. As McKinsey and Company reported in a 2009 analysis, "These educational gaps impose on the United States the economic equivalent of a permanent national recession." Reforms are usually proposed by thinkers who aim to redress societal ills or institute societal changes, most often through a change in the education of the members of a class of people—the preparation of a ruling class to rule or a working class to work, the social hygiene of a lower or immigrant class, the preparation of citizens in a democracy or republic, etc. The idea that all children should be provided with a high level of education is a relatively recent idea, and has arisen largely in the context of Western democracy in the 20th century.

The "beliefs" of school districts are optimistic that quite literally "all students will succeed", which in the context of high school graduation examination in the United States, all students in all groups, regardless of heritage or income will pass tests that in the introduction typically fall beyond the ability of all but the top 20 to 30 percent of students. The claims clearly renounce historical research that shows that all ethnic and income groups score differently on all standardized tests and standards based assessments and that students will achieve on a bell curve. Instead, education officials across the world believe that by setting clear, achievable, higher standards, aligning the curriculum, and assessing outcomes, learning can be increased for all students, and more students can succeed than the 50 percent who are defined to be above or below grade level by norm referenced standards.

States have tried to use state schools to increase state power, especially to make better soldiers and workers. This strategy was first adopted to unify related linguistic groups in Europe, including France, Germany and Italy. Exact mechanisms are unclear, but it often fails in areas where populations are culturally segregated, as when the U.S. Indian school service failed to suppress Lakota and Navaho, or when a culture has widely respected autonomous cultural institutions, as when the Spanish failed to suppress Catalan.

Many students of democracy have desired to improve education in order to improve the quality of governance in democratic societies; the necessity of good public education follows logically if one believes that the quality of democratic governance depends on the ability of citizens to make informed, intelligent choices, and that education can improve these abilities.

Politically motivated educational reforms of the democratic type are recorded as far back as Plato in The Republic. In the United States, this lineage of democratic education reform was continued by Thomas Jefferson, who advocated ambitious reforms partly along Platonic lines for public schooling in Virginia.

Another motivation for reform is the desire to address socio-economic problems, which many people see as having significant roots in lack of education. Starting in the 20th century, people have attempted to argue that small improvements in education can have large returns in such areas as health, wealth and well-being. For example, in Kerala, India in the 1950s, increases in women's health were correlated with increases in female literacy rates. In Iran, increased primary education was correlated with increased farming efficiencies and income. In both cases some researchers have concluded these correlations as representing an underlying causal relationship: education causes socio-economic benefits. In the case of Iran, researchers concluded that the improvements were due to farmers gaining reliable access to national crop prices and scientific farming information.

History

Classical education

As taught from the 18th to the 19th century, Western classical education curriculums focused on concrete details like "Who?", "What?", "When?", "Where?". Unless carefully taught, large group instruction naturally neglects asking the theoretical "Why?" and "Which?" questions that can be discussed in smaller groups.

Classical education in this period also did not teach local (vernacular) languages and culture. Instead, it taught high-status ancient languages (Greek and Latin) and their cultures. This produced odd social effects in which an intellectual class might be more loyal to ancient cultures and institutions than to their native vernacular languages and their actual governing authorities.

18th century

Child-study

Jean-Jacques Rousseau, father of the Child Study Movement, centered the child as an object of study.

In Emile: Or, On Education, Rousseau's principal work on education lays out an educational program for a hypothetical newborn's education through adulthood.

Rousseau provided a dual critique of the educational vision outlined in Plato's Republic and that of his society in contemporary Europe. He regarded the educational methods contributing to the child's development; he held that a person could either be a man or a citizen. While Plato's plan could have brought the latter at the expense of the former, contemporary education failed at both tasks. He advocated a radical withdrawal of the child from society and an educational process that utilized the child's natural potential and curiosity, teaching the child by confronting them with simulated real-life obstacles and conditioning the child through experience rather intellectual instruction.

Rousseau ideas were rarely implemented directly, but influenced later thinkers, particularly Johann Heinrich Pestalozzi and Friedrich Wilhelm August Fröbel, the inventor of the kindergarten.

National identity
European and Asian nations regard education as essential to maintaining national, cultural, and linguistic unity. In the late 18th century (~1779), Prussia instituted primary school reforms expressly to teach a unified version of the national language, "Hochdeutsch".

One significant reform was kindergarten whose purpose was to have the children participate in supervised activities taught by instructors who spoke the national language. The concept embraced the idea that children absorb new language skills more easily and quickly when they are young

The current model of kindergarten is reflective of the Prussian model.

In other countries, such as the Soviet Union, France, Spain, and Germany, the Prussian model has dramatically improved reading and math test scores for linguistic minorities.

19th century England
In the 19th century, before the advent of government-funded public schools, Protestant organizations established Charity Schools to educate the lower social classes. The Roman Catholic Church and governments later adopted the model.

Designed to be inexpensive, Charity schools operated on minimal budgets and strived to serve as many needy children as possible. This led to the development of grammar schools, which primarily focused on teaching literacy, grammar, and bookkeeping skills so that the students could use books as an inexpensive resource to continue their education. Grammar was the first third of the then-prevalent system of classical education..

Educators Joseph Lancaster and Andrew Bell developed the monitorial system, also known as "mutual instruction" or the "Bell–Lancaster method". Their contemporary, educationalist and writer Elizabeth Hamilton, suggested that in some important aspects the method had been "anticipated" by the Belfast schoolmaster David Manson. In the 1760s Manson had developed a peer-teaching and monitoring system within the context of what he called a "play school" that dispensed with "the discipline of the rod". (More radically, Manson proposed the "liberty of each [child] to take the quantity [of lessons] agreeable to his inclination").

Lancaster, an impoverished Quaker during the early 19th century in London and Bell at the Madras School of India developed this model independent of one another. However, by design, their model utilizes more advanced students as a resource to teach the less advanced students; achieving student-teacher ratios as small as 1:2 and educating more than 1000 students per adult. The lack of adult supervision at the Lancaster school resulted in the older children acting as disciplinary monitors and taskmasters.

To provide order and promote discipline the school implemented a unique internal economic system, inventing a currency called a Scrip.  Although the currency was worthless in the outside world, it was created at a fixed exchange rate from a student's tuition and student's could use scrip to buy food, school supplies, books, and other items from the school store. Students could earn scrip through tutoring. To promote discipline, the school adopted a work-study model. Every job of the school was bid-for by students, with the largest bid winning. However, any student tutor could auction positions in his or her classes to earn scrip. The bids for student jobs paid for the adult supervision.
Lancaster promoted his system in a piece called Improvements in Education that spread widely throughout the English-speaking world. Lancaster schools provided a grammar-school education with fully developed internal economies for a cost per student near $40 per year in 1999 U.S. dollars. To reduce cost and motivated to save up scrip, Lancaster students rented individual pages of textbooks from the school library instead of purchasing the textbook. Student's would read aloud their pages to groups. Students commonly exchanged tutoring and paid for items and services with receipts from down tutoring.

The schools did not teach submission to orthodox Christian beliefs or government authorities. As a result, most English-speaking countries developed mandatory publicly paid education explicitly to keep public education in "responsible" hands. These elites said that Lancaster schools might become dishonest, provide poor education, and were not accountable to established authorities. Lancaster's supporters responded that any child could cheat given the opportunity, and that the government was not paying for the education and thus deserved no say in their composition.

Though motivated by charity, Lancaster claimed in his pamphlets to be surprised to find that he lived well on the income of his school, even while the low costs made it available to the most impoverished street children. Ironically, Lancaster lived on the charity of friends in his later life.

Modern reformist

Although educational reform occurred on a local level at various points throughout history, the modern notion of education reform is tied with the spread of compulsory education. Economic growth and the spread of democracy raised the value of education and increased the importance of ensuring that all children and adults have access to free, high-quality, effective education. Modern education reforms are increasingly driven by a growing understanding of what works in education and how to go about successfully improving teaching and learning in schools.  However, in some cases, the reformers' goals of "high-quality education" has meant "high-intensity education", with a narrow emphasis on teaching individual, test-friendly subskills quickly, regardless of long-term outcomes, developmental appropriateness, or broader educational goals.

Horace Mann 

In the United States, Horace Mann (1796 – 1859) of Massachusetts used his political base and role as Secretary of the Massachusetts State Board of Education to promote public education in his home state and nationwide.  Advocating a substantial public investment be made in education, Mann and his proponents developed a strong system of state supported common schools..

His crusading style attracted wide middle class support. Historian Ellwood P. Cubberley asserts:
 No one did more than he to establish in the minds of the American people the conception that education should be universal, non-sectarian, free, and that its aims should be social efficiency, civic virtue, and character, rather than mere learning or the advancement of sectarian ends.
In 1852, Massachusetts passed a law making education mandatory.  This model of free, accessible education spread throughout the country and in 1917 Mississippi was the final state to adopt the law.

John Dewey 

John Dewey, a philosopher and educator based in Chicago and New York, helped conceptualize the role of American and international education during the first four decades of the 20th century. An important member of the American Pragmatist movement, he carried the subordination of knowledge to action into the educational world by arguing for experiential education that would enable children to learn theory and practice simultaneously; a well-known example is the practice of teaching elementary physics and biology to students while preparing a meal. He was a harsh critic of "dead" knowledge disconnected from practical human life.

Dewey criticized the rigidity and volume of humanistic education, and the emotional idealizations of education based on the child-study movement that had been inspired by Rousseau and those who followed him. Dewey understood that children are naturally active and curious and learn by doing. Dewey's understanding of logic is presented in his work "Logic, the Theory of Inquiry" (1938). His educational philosophies were presented in "My Pedagogic Creed", The School and Society, The Child and Curriculum, and Democracy and Education (1916). Bertrand Russell criticized Dewey's conception of logic, saying "What he calls "logic" does not seem to me to be part of logic at all; I should call it part of psychology."

Dewey left the University of Chicago in 1904 over issues relating to the Dewey School.

Dewey's influence began to decline in the time after the Second World War and particularly in the Cold War era, as more conservative educational policies came to the fore.

Administrative progressives
The form of educational progressivism which was most successful in having its policies implemented has been dubbed "administrative progressivism" by historians. This began to be implemented in the early 20th century. While influenced particularly in its rhetoric by Dewey and even more by his popularizers, administrative progressivism was in its practice much more influenced by the Industrial Revolution and the concept economies of scale.

The administrative progressives are responsible for many features of modern American education, especially American high schools: counseling programs, the move from many small local high schools to large centralized high schools, curricular differentiation in the form of electives and tracking, curricular, professional, and other forms of standardization, and an increase in state and federal regulation and bureaucracy, with a corresponding reduction of local control at the school board level. (Cf. "State, federal, and local control of education in the United States", below) (Tyack and Cuban, pp. 17–26)

These reforms have since become heavily entrenched, and many today who identify themselves as progressives are opposed to many of them, while conservative education reform during the Cold War embraced them as a framework for strengthening traditional curriculum and standards.

More recent methods, instituted by groups such as the think tank Reform's education division, and S.E.R. have attempted to pressure the government of the U.K. into more modernist educational reform, though this has met with limited success.

Public school reform in the United States 
In the United States, public education is characterized as "any federally funded primary or secondary school, administered to some extent by the government, and charged with educating all citizens. Although there is typically a cost to attend some public higher education institutions, they are still considered part of public education."

Colonial America 
In what would become the United States, the first public school was established in Boston, Massachusetts, on April 23, 1635. Puritan schoolmaster Philemon Pormont led instruction at the Boston Latin School. During this time, post-secondary education was a commonly utilized tool to distinguish one's social class and social status. Access to education was the "privilege of white, upper-class, Christian male children" in preparation for university education in ministry.

In colonial America, to maintain Puritan religious traditions, formal and informal education instruction focused on teaching literacy. All colonists needed to understand the written language on some fundamental level in order to read the Bible and the colony's written secular laws. Religious leaders recognized that each person should be "educated enough to meet the individual needs of their station in life and social harmony." The first compulsory education laws were passed in Massachusetts between 1642 and 1648 when religious leaders noticed not all parents were providing their children with proper education. These laws stated that all towns with 50 or more families were obligated to hire a schoolmaster to teach children reading, writing, and basic arithmetic."In 1642 the General Court passed a law that required heads of households to teach all their dependents — apprentices and servants as well as their own children — to read English or face a fine. Parents could provide the instruction themselves or hire someone else to do it. Selectmen were to keep 'a vigilant eye over their brethren and neighbors,' young people whose education was neglected could be removed from their parents or masters."The 1647 law eventually led to establishing publicly funded district schools in all Massachusetts towns, although, despite the threat of fines, compliance and quality of public schools were less than satisfactory."Many towns were 'shamefully neglectful' of children's education. In 1718 '...by sad experience, it is found that many towns that not only are obliged by law, but are very able to support a grammar school, yet choose rather to incur and pay the fine or penalty than maintain a grammar school."When John Adams drafted the Massachusetts Constitution in 1780, he included provisions for a comprehensive education law that guaranteed public education to "all" citizens. However, access to formal education in secondary schools and colleges was reserved for free, white males. During the 17th and 18th centuries, females received little or no formal education except for home learning or attending Dame Schools.  Likewise, many educational institutions maintained a policy of refusing to admit Black applicants. The Virginia Code of 1819 outlawed teaching enslaved people to read or write.

Post-revolution 
Soon after the American Revolution, early leaders, like Thomas Jefferson and John Adams, proposed the creation of a more "formal and unified system of publicly funded schools" to satiate the need to "build and maintain commerce, agriculture and shipping interests". Their concept of free public education was not well received and did not begin to take hold on until the 1830s. However, in 1790, evolving socio-cultural ideals in the Commonwealth of Pennsylvania led to the first significant and systematic reform in education legislation that mandated economic conditions would not inhibit a child's access to education:"Constitution of the Commonwealth of Pennsylvania – 1790 ARTICLE VII Section I. The legislature shall, as soon as conveniently may be, provide, by law, for the establishment of schools throughout the state, in such manner that the poor may be taught gratis."

Reconstruction and the American Industrial Revolution 
During Reconstruction, from 1865 to 1877, African Americans worked to encourage public education in the South. With the U.S. Supreme Court decision in Plessy v. Ferguson, which held that "segregated public facilities were constitutional so long as the black and white facilities were equal to each other", this meant that African American children were legally allowed to attend public schools, although these schools were still segregated based on race. However, by the mid-twentieth century, civil rights groups would challenge racial segregation.

During the second half of the nineteenth century (1870 and 1914), America's Industrial Revolution refocused the nation's attention on the need for a universally accessible public school system. Inventions, innovations, and improved production methods were critical to the continued growth of American manufacturing. To compete in the global economy, an overwhelming demand for literate workers that possessed practical training emerged. Citizens argued, "educating children of the poor and middle classes would prepare them to obtain good jobs, thereby strengthen the nation's economic position." Institutions became an essential tool in yielding ideal factory workers with sought-after attitudes and desired traits such as dependability, obedience, and punctuality. Vocationally oriented schools offered practical subjects like shop classes for students who were not planning to attend college for financial or other reasons. Not until the latter part of the 19th century did public elementary schools become available throughout the country. Although, it would be longer for children of color, girls, and children with special needs to attain access free public education.

Mid 20th and early 21st century (United states)

Civil rights reform 
Systemic bias remained a formidable barrier. From the 1950s to the 1970s, many of the proposed and implemented reforms in U.S. education stemmed from the civil rights movement and related trends; examples include ending racial segregation, and busing for the purpose of desegregation, affirmative action, and banning of school prayer.

In the early 1950s, most U.S. public schools operated under a legally sanctioned racial segregation system. Civil Rights reform movements sought to address the biases that ensure unequal distribution of academic resources such as school funding, qualified and experienced teachers, and learning materials to those socially excluded communities.  In the early 1950s, the NAACP lawyers brought class-action lawsuits on behalf of black schoolchildren and their families in Kansas, South Carolina, Virginia, and Delaware, petitioning court orders to compel school districts to let black students attend white public schools. Finally, in 1954, the U.S. Supreme Court rejected that framework with Brown v. Board of Education and declared state-sponsored segregation of public schools unconstitutional.

In 1964, Title VI of the Civil Rights Act (Public Law 88-352) "prohibited discrimination on the basis of race, color, and national origin in programs and activities receiving federal financial assistance." Educational institutions could now utilize public funds to implement in-service training programs to assist teachers and administrators in establishing desegregation plans.

In 1965, the Higher Education Act (HEA) (Public Law 89–329) authorizes federal aid for postsecondary students.

The Elementary and Secondary Education Act of 1965 (ESEA) (Public Law 89-313) represents the federal government's commitment to providing equal access to quality education; including those children from low-income families, limited English proficiency, and other minority groups. This legislation had positive retroactive implications for Historically Black Colleges and Universities, more commonly known as HBCUs."The Higher Education Act of 1965, as amended, defines an HBCU as: "…any historically black college or university that was established prior to 1964, whose principal mission was, and is, the education of black Americans, and that is accredited by a nationally recognized accrediting agency or association determined by the Secretary [of Education] to be a reliable authority as to the quality of training offered or is, according to such an agency or association, making reasonable progress toward accreditation."Known as the Bilingual Education Act, Title VII of ESEA (Public Law 90-247), offered federal aid to school districts to provide bilingual instruction for students with limited English speaking ability.

The Education Amendments of 1972 (Public Law 92-318, 86 Stat. 327) establishes the Education Division in the U.S. Department of Health, Education, and Welfare and the National Institute of Education. Title IX of the Education Amendments of 1972 states, "No person in the United States shall, on the basis of sex, be excluded from participation in, be denied the benefits of, or be subjected to discrimination under any education program or activity receiving Federal financial assistance."

Equal Educational Opportunities Act of 1974 (Public Law 93-380) - Civil Rights Amendments to the Elementary and Secondary Education Act of 1965:"Title I: Bilingual Education Act - Authorizes appropriations for carrying out the provisions of this Act. Establishes, in the Office of Education, an Office of Bilingual Education through which the Commissioner of Education shall carry out his functions relating to bilingual education. Authorizes appropriations for school nutrition and health services, correction education services, and ethnic heritage studies centers.

Title II: Equal Educational Opportunities and the Transportation of Students: Equal Educational Opportunities Act - Provides that no state shall deny equal educational opportunity to an individual on account of his or her race, color, sex, or national origin by means of specified practices...

Title IV: Consolidation of Certain Education Programs: Authorizes appropriations for use in various education programs including libraries and learning resources, education for use of the metric system of measurement, gifted and talented children programs, community schools, career education, consumers' education, women's equity in education programs, and arts in education programs.

Community Schools Act - Authorizes the Commissioner to make grants to local educational agencies to assist in planning, establishing, expanding, and operating community education programs

Women's Educational Equity Act - Establishes the Advisory Council on Women's Educational Programs and sets forth the composition of such Council. Authorizes the Commissioner of Education to make grants to, and enter into contracts with, public agencies, private nonprofit organizations, and individuals for activities designed to provide educational equity for women in the United States.

Title V: Education Administration: Family Educational Rights and Privacy Act (FERPA)- Provides that no funds shall be made available under the General Education Provisions Act to any State or local educational agency or educational institution which denies or prevents the parents of students to inspect and review all records and files regarding their children.

Title VII: National Reading Improvement Program: Authorizes the Commissioner to contract with State or local educational agencies for the carrying out by such agencies, in schools having large numbers of children with reading deficiencies, of demonstration projects involving the use of innovative methods, systems, materials, or programs which show promise of overcoming such reading deficiencies."In 1975, The Education for All Handicapped Children Act (Public Law 94-142) ensured that all handicapped children (age 3-21) receive a "free, appropriate public education" designed to meet their special needs.

1980-1989: A Nation at Risk 

During the 1980s, some of the momentum of education reform moved from the left to the right, with the release of A Nation at Risk, Ronald Reagan's efforts to reduce or eliminate the United States Department of Education.  "[T]he federal government and virtually all state governments, teacher training institutions, teachers' unions, major foundations, and the mass media have all pushed strenuously for higher standards, greater accountability, more "time on task," and more impressive academic results".

Per the shift in educational motivation, families sought institutional alternatives, including "charter schools, progressive schools, Montessori schools, Waldorf schools, Afrocentric schools, religious schools - or home school instruction in their communities."

In 1984 President Reagan enacted the Education for Economic Security Act (Public Law 98-377)

In 1989, the Child Development and Education Act of 1989 (Public Law 101-239) authorized funds for Head Start Programs to include child care services.

In the latter half of the decade, E. D. Hirsch put forth an influential attack on one or more versions of progressive education. Advocating an emphasis on "cultural literacy"—the facts, phrases, and texts.

See also Uncommon Schools.

1990-2000: standards-based education model

In 1994, the land grant system was expanded via the Elementary and Secondary Education Act to include tribal colleges.

Most states and districts in the 1990s adopted outcome-based education (OBE) in some form or another. A state would create a committee to adopt standards, and choose a quantitative instrument to assess whether the students knew the required content or could perform the required tasks.

In 1992 The National Commission on Time and Learning, Extension (Public Law 102–359) revise funding for civic education programs and those educationally disadvantaged children."

In 1994 the Improving America's Schools Act (IASA) (Public Law 103-382) reauthorized the Elementary and Secondary Education Act of 1965; amended as The Eisenhower Professional Development Program; IASA designated Title I funds for low income and otherwise marginalized groups; i.e., females, minorities, individuals with disabilities, individuals with limited English proficiency (LEP). By tethering federal funding distributions to student achievement, IASA meant use high stakes testing and curriculum standards to hold schools accountable for their results at the same level as other students. The Act significantly increased impact aid for the establishment of the Charter School Program, drug awareness campaigns, bilingual education, and technology.

In 1998 The Charter School Expansion Act (Public Law 105-278) amended the Charter School Program, enacted in 1994.

2001-2015: No Child Left Behind 
Consolidated Appropriations Act of 2001 (Public Law 106-554) appropriated funding to repair educational institution's buildings as well as repair and renovate charter school facilities, reauthorized the Even Start program, and enacted the Children's Internet Protection Act.

The standards-based National Education Goals 2000, set by the U.S. Congress in the 1990s, were based on the principles of outcomes-based education. In 2002, the standards-based reform movement culminated as the No Child left Behind Act of 2001 (Public Law 107-110)  where achievement standard were set by each individual state. This federal policy was active until 2015 in the United States .

An article released by CBNC.com said a principal Senate Committee will take into account legislation that reauthorizes and modernizes the Carl D. Perkins Act. President George Bush approved this statute in 2006 on August 12, 2006. This new bill will emphasize the importance of federal funding for various Career and Technical (CTE) programs that will better provide learners with in-demand skills. Pell Grants are specific amount of money is given by the government every school year for disadvantaged students who need to pay tuition fees in college.

At present, there are many initiatives aimed at dealing with these concerns like innovative cooperation between federal and state governments, educators, and the business sector. One of these efforts is the Pathways to Technology Early College High School (P-TECH). This six-year program was launched in cooperation with IBM, educators from three cities in New York, Chicago, and Connecticut, and over 400 businesses. The program offers students in high school and associate programs focusing on the STEM  curriculum. The High School Involvement Partnership, private and public venture, was established through the help of Northrop Grumman, a global security firm. It has given assistance to some 7,000 high school students (juniors and seniors) since 1971 by means of one-on-one coaching as well as exposure to STEM areas and careers.

2016-2021: Every Student Succeeds Act 
The American Reinvestment and Recovery Act, enacted in 2009, reserved more than $85 billion in public funds to be used for education.

The 2009 Council of Chief State School Officers and the National Governors Association launch the Common Core State Standards Initiative.

In 2012 the Obama administration launched the Race to the Top competition aimed at spurring K–12 education reform through higher standards."The Race to the Top – District competition will encourage transformative change within schools, targeted toward leveraging, enhancing, and improving classroom practices and resources.

The four key areas of reform include:

 Development of rigorous standards and better assessments
 Adoption of better data systems to provide schools, teachers, and parents with information about student progress
 Support for teachers and school leaders to become more effective
 Increased emphasis and resources for the rigorous interventions needed to turn around the lowest-performing schools"In 2015, under the Obama administration, many of the more restrictive elements that were enacted under No Child Left Behind (NCLB, 2001), were removed in the Every Student Succeeds Act (ESSA, 2015) which limits the role of the federal government in school liability. Every Student Succeeds Act (Public Law 114-95) reformed educational standards by "moving away from such high stakes and assessment based accountability models" and focused on assessing student achievement from a holistic approach by utilizing qualitative measures. Some argue that giving states more authority can help prevent considerable discrepancies in educational performance across different states. ESSA was approved by former President Obama in 2015 which amended and empowered the Elementary and Secondary Education Act of 1965. The Department of Education has the choice to carry out measures in drawing attention to said differences by pinpointing lowest-performing state governments and supplying information on the condition and progress of each state on different educational parameters. It can also provide reasonable funding along with technical aid to help states with similar demographics collaborate in improving their public education programs.

Social and emotional learning: strengths-based education model 
This uses a methodology that values purposeful engagement in activities that turn students into self-reliant and efficient learners. Holding on to the view that everyone possesses natural gifts that are unique to one's personality (e.g. computational aptitude, musical talent, visual arts abilities), it likewise upholds the idea that children, despite their inexperience and tender age, are capable of coping with anguish, able to survive hardships, and can rise above difficult times.

Trump administration 
In 2017, Betsy DeVos was instated as the 11th Secretary of Education. A strong proponent of school choice, school voucher programs, and charter schools, DeVos was a much-contested choice as her own education and career had little to do with formal experience in the US education system.  In a Republican-dominated senate, she received a 50–50 vote - a tie that was broken by Vice President Mike Pence.  Prior to her appointment, DeVos received a BA degree in business economics from Calvin College in Grand Rapids, Michigan and she served as chairman of an investment management firm, The Windquest Group. She supported the idea of leaving education to state governments under the new K-12 legislation. DeVos cited the interventionist approach of the federal government to education policy following the signing of the ESSA. The primary approach to that rule has not changed significantly. Her opinion was that the education movement populist politics or populism encouraged reformers to commit promises which were not very realistic and therefore difficult to deliver.

On July 31, 2018, President Donald Trump signed the Strengthening Career and Technical Education for the 21st Century Act (HR 2353)  The Act reauthorized the Carl D. Perkins Career and Technical Education Act, a $1.2 billion program modified by the United States Congress in 2006. A move to change the Higher Education Act was also deferred.

The legislation enacted on July 1, 2019, replaced the Carl D. Perkins Career and Technical Education (Perkins IV) Act of 2006. Stipulations in Perkins V enables school districts to make use of federal subsidies for all students' career search and development activities in the middle grades as well as comprehensive guidance and academic mentoring in the upper grades. At the same time, this law revised the meaning of "special populations" to include homeless persons, foster youth, those who left the foster care system, and children with parents on active duty in the United States armed forces.

Barriers to reform

Education inequalities facing students of color 
Another factor to consider in education reform is that of equity and access. Contemporary issues in the United States regarding education faces a history of inequalities that come with consequences for education attainment across different social groups.

Racial and socioeconomic class segregation 
A history of racial, and subsequently class, segregation in the U.S. resulted from practices of law. Residential segregation is a direct result of twentieth century policies that separated by race using zoning and redlining practices, in addition to other housing policies, whose effects continue to endure in the United States. These neighborhoods that have been segregated de jure—by force of purposeful public policy at the federal, state, and local levels—disadvantage people of color as students must attend school near their homes.

With the inception of the New Deal between 1933 and 1939, and during and following World War II, federally funded public housing was explicitly racially segregated by the local government in conjunction with federal policies through projects that were designated for Whites or Black Americans in the South, Northeast, Midwest, and West. Following an ease on the housing shortage post-World War II, the federal government subsidized the relocation of Whites to suburbs. The Federal Housing and Veterans Administration constructed such developments on the East Coast in towns like Levittown on Long Island, New Jersey, Pennsylvania, and Delaware. On the West Coast, there was Panorama City, Lakewood, Westlake, and Seattle suburbs developed by Bertha and William Boeing. As White families left for the suburbs, Black families remained in public housing and were explicitly placed in Black neighborhoods. Policies such as public housing director, Harold Ickes', "neighborhood composition rule" maintained this segregation by establishing that public housing must not interfere with pre-existing racial compositions of neighborhoods. Federal loan guarantees were given to builders who adhered to the condition that no sales were made to Black families and each deed prohibited re-sales to Black families, what the Federal Housing Administration (FHA) described as an "incompatible racial element". In addition, banks and savings intuitions refused loans to Black families in White suburbs and Black families in Black neighborhoods. In the mid-twentieth century, urban renewal programs forced low-income black residents to reside in places farther from universities, hospitals, or business districts and relocation options consisted of public housing high-rises and ghettos.

This history of de jure segregation has impacted resource allocation for public education in the United States, with schools continuing to be segregated by race and class. Low-income White students are more likely than Black students to be integrated into middle-class neighborhoods and less likely to attend schools with other predominantly disadvantaged students. Students of color disproportionately attend underfunded schools and Title I schools in environments entrenched in environmental pollution and stagnant economic mobility with limited access to college readiness resources. According to research, schools attended by primarily Hispanic or African American students often have high turnover of teaching staff and are labeled high-poverty schools, in addition to having limited educational specialists, less available extracurricular opportunities,  greater numbers of provisionally licensed teachers, little access to technology, and buildings that are not well maintained. With this segregation, more local property tax is allocated to wealthier communities and public schools' dependence on local property taxes has led to large disparities in funding between neighboring districts. The top 10% of wealthiest school districts spend approximately ten times more per student than the poorest 10% of school districts.

Racial wealth gap 
This history of racial and socioeconomic class segregation in the U.S. has manifested into a racial wealth divide. With this history of geographic and economic segregation, trends illustrate a racial wealth gap that has impacted educational outcomes and its concomitant economic gains for minorities. Wealth or net worth—the difference between gross assets and debt—is a stock of financial resources and a significant indicator of financial security that offers a more complete measure of household capability and functioning than income. Within the same income bracket, the chance of completing college differs for White and Black students. Nationally, White students are at least 11% more likely to complete college across all four income groups. Intergenerational wealth is another result of this history, with White college-educated families three times as likely as Black families to get an inheritance of $10,000 or more. 10.6% of White children from low-income backgrounds and 2.5% of Black children from low-income backgrounds reach the top 20% of income distribution as adults. Less than 10% of Black children from low-income backgrounds reach the top 40%.

Access to early childhood education 
These disadvantages facing students of color are apparent early on in early childhood education. By the age of five, children of color are impacted by opportunity gaps indicated by poverty, school readiness gap, segregated low-income neighborhoods, implicit bias, and inequalities within the justice system as Hispanic and African American boys account for as much as 60% of total prisoners within the incarceration population. These populations are also more likely to experience adverse childhood experiences (ACEs).

High-quality early care and education are less accessible to children of color, particularly African American preschoolers as findings from the National Center for Education Statistics show that in 2013, 40% of Hispanic and 36% White children were enrolled in learning center-based classrooms rated as high, while 25% of African American children were enrolled in these programs. 15% of African American children attended low ranking center-based classrooms. In home-based settings, 30% of White children and over 50% of Hispanic and African American children attended low rated programs.

Contemporary issues (United States)

Overview
In the first decade of the 21st century, several issues are salient in debates over further education reform:

 Longer school day or school year
 After-school tutoring
 Charter schools, school choice, or school vouchers
 Smaller class sizes
 Improved teacher quality
 Improved training
 Higher credential standards
 Generally higher pay to attract more qualified applicants
 Performance bonuses ("merit pay")
 Firing low-performing teachers
 Internet and computer access in schools
 Track and reduce drop-out rate
 Track and reduce absenteeism
 English-only vs. bilingual education
 Mainstreaming or fully including students with special educational needs, rather than placing them in separate special schools
 Content of curriculum standards and textbooks
 What to teach, at what age, and to which students. Discussion points include the age at which children should learn to read, and the primary mathematical subject that is taught to adolescents – algebra, or statistics or personal finances.
 Funding, neglected infrastructure, and adequacy of educational supplies
 Student rights
Education inequalities facing students of color

Private interest in American charter schools 
Charter schools public independent institutions in which both the cost and risk are fully funded by the taxpayers. Some charter schools are nonprofit in name only and are structured in ways that individuals and private enterprises connected to them can make money. Other charter schools are for-profit. In many cases, the public is largely unaware of this rapidly changing educational landscape, the debate between public and private/market approaches, and the decisions that are being made that affect their children and communities. Critics have accused for-profit entities, (education management organizations, EMOs) and private foundations such as the Bill and Melinda Gates Foundation, the Eli and Edythe Broad Foundation, and the Walton Family Foundation of funding Charter school initiatives to undermine public education and turn education into a "Business Model" which can make a profit. In some cases a school's charter is held by a non-profit that chooses to contract all of the school's operations to a third party, often a for-profit, CMO. This arrangement is defined as a vendor-operated school, (VOS).

School choice
Economists such as Nobel laureate Milton Friedman advocate school choice to promote excellence in education through competition and choice. A competitive "market" for schools eliminates the need to otherwise attempt a workable method of accountability for results. Public education vouchers permit guardians to select and pay any school, public or private, with public funds currently allocated to local public schools. The theory is that children's guardians will naturally shop for the best schools, much as is already done at college level.

Though appealing in theory, many reforms based on school choice have led to slight to moderate improvements—which some teachers' union members see as insufficient to offset the decreased teacher pay and job security. For instance, New Zealand's landmark reform in 1989, during which schools were granted substantial autonomy, funding was devolved to schools, and parents were given a free choice of which school their children would attend, led to moderate improvements in most schools.  It was argued that the associated increases in inequity and greater racial stratification in schools nullified the educational gains. Others, however, argued that the original system created more inequity (due to lower income students being required to attend poorer performing inner city schools and not being allowed school choice or better educations that are available to higher income inhabitants of suburbs). Instead, it was argued that the school choice promoted social mobility and increased test scores especially in the cases of low income students. Similar results have been found in other jurisdictions. Though discouraging, the merely slight improvements of some school choice policies often seems to reflect weaknesses in the way that choice is implemented rather than a failure of the basic principle itself.

Teacher tenure
Critics of teacher tenure claim that the laws protect ineffective teachers from being fired, which can be detrimental to student success. Tenure laws vary from state to state, but generally they set a probationary period during which the teacher proves themselves worthy of the lifelong position. Probationary periods range from one to three years. Advocates for tenure reform often consider these periods too short to make such an important decision; especially when that decision is exceptionally hard to revoke. Due process restriction protect tenured teachers from being wrongfully fired; however these restrictions can also prevent administrators from removing ineffective or inappropriate teachers. A 2008 survey conducted by the US Department of Education found that, on average, only 2.1% of teachers are dismissed each year for poor performance.

In October 2010 Apple Inc. CEO Steve Jobs had a consequential meeting with U.S. President Barack Obama to discuss U.S. competitiveness and the nation's education system. During the meeting Jobs recommended pursuing policies that would make it easier for school principals to hire and fire teachers based on merit.

In 2012 tenure for school teachers was challenged in a California lawsuit called Vergara v. California. The primary issue in the case was the impact of tenure on student outcomes and on equity in education.  On June 10, 2014, the trial judge ruled that California's teacher tenure statute produced disparities that " shock the conscience" and violate the equal protection clause of the California Constitution. On July 7, 2014, U.S. Secretary of Education Arne Duncan commented on the Vergara decision during a meeting with President Barack Obama and representatives of teacher's unions. Duncan said that tenure for school teachers "should be earned through demonstrated effectiveness" and should not be granted too quickly. Specifically, he criticized the 18-month tenure period at the heart of the Vergara case as being too short to be a "meaningful bar."

Funding levels
According to a 2005 report from the OECD, the United States is tied for first place with Switzerland when it comes to annual spending per student on its public schools, with each of those two countries spending more than $11,000 (in U.S. currency).
Despite this high level of funding, U.S. public schools lag behind the schools of other rich countries in the areas of reading, math, and science. A further analysis of developed countries shows no correlation between per student spending and student performance, suggesting that there are other factors influencing education. Top performers include Singapore, Finland and Korea, all with relatively low spending on education, while high spenders including Norway and Luxembourg have relatively low performance. One possible factor is the distribution of the funding.

In the US, schools in wealthy areas tend to be over-funded while schools in poorer areas tend to be underfunded. These differences in spending between schools or districts may accentuate inequalities, if they result in the best teachers moving to teach in the most wealthy areas.  The inequality between districts and schools led to 23 states instituting school finance reform based on adequacy standards that aim to increase funding to low-income districts. A 2018 study found that between 1990 and 2012, these finance reforms led to an increase in funding and test scores in the low income districts; which suggests finance reform is effective at bridging inter-district performance inequalities. It has also been shown that the socioeconomic situation of the students family has the most influence in determining success; suggesting that even if increased funds in a low income area increase performance, they may still perform worse than their peers from wealthier districts.

Starting in the early 1980s, a series of analyses by Eric Hanushek indicated that the amount spent on schools bore little relationship to student learning. This controversial argument, which focused attention on how money was spent instead of how much was spent, led to lengthy scholarly exchanges. In part the arguments fed into the class size debates and other discussions of "input policies." It also moved reform efforts towards issues of school accountability (including No Child Left Behind) and the use of merit pay and other incentives.

There have been studies that show smaller class sizes and newer buildings (both of which require higher funding to implement) lead to academic improvements. It should also be noted that many of the reform ideas that stray from the traditional format require greater funding.

According to a 1999 article, William J. Bennett, former U.S. Secretary of Education, argued that increased levels of spending on public education have not made the schools better, citing the following statistics:

Internationally

Education for All 

Education 2030 Agenda refers to the global commitment of the Education for All movement to ensure access to basic education for all.  It is an essential part of the 2030 Agenda for Sustainable Development. The roadmap to achieve the Agenda is the Education 2030 Incheon Declaration and Framework for Action, which outlines how countries, working with UNESCO and global partners, can translate commitments into action.

The United Nations, over 70 ministers, representatives of member-countries, bilateral and multilateral agencies, regional organizations, academic institutions, teachers, civil society, and the youth supported the Framework for Action of the Education 2030 platform. The Framework was described as the outcome of continuing consultation to provide guidance for countries in implementing this Agenda. At the same time, it mobilizes various stakeholders in the new education objectives, coordination, implementation process, funding, and review of Education 2030.

Thailand

In 1995, the minister of education, Sukavich Rangsitpol, launched a series of education reforms in 1995 with the intention of the education reform is to realize the potential of Thai people to develop themselves for a better quality of life and to develop the nation for a peaceful co-existence in the global community. The follow-on Reform Program of 1996 is built around four major improvements:
 improving the physical state of schools
 upgrading the quality of teachers
 reforming learning and teaching methods
 streamlining administration 

School-based management (SBM) in Thailand implemented in 1997 in the course of a reform aimed at overcoming a profound crisis in the educación system.

According to UNESCO, Thailand education reform has led to the following results:

 The educational budget increased from 133 billion baht in 1996 to 163 billion baht in 1997 (22.5% increase)
 Since 1996, first grade students have been taught English as a second or foreign language and computer literacy. 
 Professional advancement from teacher level 6 to teacher level 7 without having to submit academic work for consideration was approved by the Thai government. 
 Free 12 years education for all children provided by the government. The Eighth Thailand’s National Social and Economic Development Plan was also written to support the implemented of education reform program. This program was later added to the 1997 Constitution of Thailand and gave access to all citizens.

World Bank report that after the 1997 Asian financial crisis Income in the northeast, the poorest part of Thailand, has risen by 46 percent from 1998 to 2006. Nationwide poverty fell from 21.3 to 11.3 percent.

Learning crisis 
The learning crisis is the reality that while the majority of children around the world attend school, a large proportion of them are not learning. A World Bank study found that "53 percent of children in low- and middle-income countries cannot read and understand a simple story by the end of primary school." While schooling has increased rapidly over the last few decades, learning has not followed suit. Many practitioners and academics call for education system reform in order to address the learning needs of all children.

Digital education

The movement to use computers more in education naturally includes many unrelated ideas, methods, and pedagogies since there are many uses for digital computers. For example, the fact that computers are naturally good at math leads to the question of the use of calculators in math education. The Internet's communication capabilities make it potentially useful for collaboration, and foreign language learning. The computer's ability to simulate physical systems makes it potentially useful in teaching science. More often, however, debate of digital education reform centers around more general applications of computers to education, such as electronic test-taking and online classes.

Another viable addition to digital education has been blended learning.  In 2009, over 3 million K-12 students took an online course, compared to 2000 when 45,000 took an online course. Blended learning examples include pure online, blended, and traditional education.  Research results show that the most effective learning takes place in a blended format. This allows children to view the lecture ahead of time and then spend class time practicing, refining, and applying what they have previously learned.

The idea of creating artificial intelligence led some computer scientists to believe that teachers could be replaced by computers, through something like an expert system; however, attempts to accomplish this have predictably proved inflexible. The computer is now more understood to be a tool or assistant for the teacher and students.

Harnessing the richness of the Internet is another goal. In some cases classrooms have been moved entirely online, while in other instances the goal is more to learn how the Internet can be more than a classroom.

Web-based international educational software is under development by students at New York University, based on the belief that current educational institutions are too rigid: effective teaching is not routine, students are not passive, and questions of practice are not predictable or standardized. The software allows for courses tailored to an individual's abilities through frequent and automatic multiple intelligences assessments. Ultimate goals include assisting students to be intrinsically motivated to educate themselves, and aiding the student in self-actualization. Courses typically taught only in college are being reformatted so that they can be taught to any level of student, whereby elementary school students may learn the foundations of any topic they desire. Such a program has the potential to remove the bureaucratic inefficiencies of education in modern countries, and with the decreasing digital divide, help developing nations rapidly achieve a similar quality of education. With an open format similar to Wikipedia, any teacher may upload their courses online and a feedback system will help students choose relevant courses of the highest quality. Teachers can provide links in their digital courses to webcast videos of their lectures. Students will have personal academic profiles and a forum will allow students to pose complex questions, while simpler questions will be automatically answered by the software, which will bring you to a solution by searching through the knowledge database, which includes all available courses and topics.

The 21st century ushered in the acceptance and encouragement of internet research conducted on college and university campuses, in homes, and even in gathering areas of shopping centers. Addition of cyber cafes on campuses and coffee shops, loaning of communication devices from libraries, and availability of more portable technology devices, opened up a world of educational resources.  Availability of knowledge to the elite had always been obvious, yet provision of networking devices, even wireless gadget sign-outs from libraries, made availability of information an expectation of most persons. Cassandra B. Whyte researched the future of computer use on higher education campuses focusing on student affairs. Though at first seen as a data collection and outcome reporting tool, the use of computer technology in the classrooms, meeting areas, and homes continued to unfold.  The sole dependence on paper resources for subject information diminished and e-books and articles, as well as online courses, were anticipated to become increasingly staple and affordable choices provided by higher education institutions according to Whyte in a 2002 presentation.

Digitally "flipping" classrooms is a trend in digital education that has gained significant momentum. Will Richardson, author and visionary for the digital education realm, points to the not-so-distant future and the seemingly infinite possibilities for digital communication linked to improved education.  Education on the whole, as a stand-alone entity, has been slow to embrace these changes. The use of web tools such as wikis, blogs, and social networking sites is tied to increasing overall effectiveness of digital education in schools.  Examples exist of teacher and student success stories where learning has transcended the classroom and has reached far out into society.

The media has been instrumental in pushing formal educational institutions to become savvier in their methods.  Additionally, advertising has been (and continues to be) a vital force in shaping students and parents thought patterns.

Technology is a dynamic entity that is constantly in flux.  As time presses on, new technologies will continue to break paradigms that will reshape human thinking regarding technological innovation.  This concept stresses a certain disconnect between teachers and learners and the growing chasm that started some time ago.  Richardson asserts that traditional classroom's will essentially enter entropy unless teachers increase their comfort and proficiency with technology.

Administrators are not exempt from the technological disconnect.  They must recognize the existence of a younger generation of teachers who were born during the Digital Age and are very comfortable with technology.  However, when old meets new, especially in a mentoring situation, conflict seems inevitable.  Ironically, the answer to the outdated mentor may be digital collaboration with worldwide mentor webs; composed of individuals with creative ideas for the classroom.

See also

 Anti-schooling activism
 Blab school
 Block scheduling
 Certificate of Initial Mastery
 Criterion-referenced test
 Educational philosophies
 Excellence and equity
 Female education
 High school graduation examination
 Higher-order thinking
 Inquiry-based Science
 Learning crisis
 Learning environment
 Learning space
 Merit pay
 Multiculturalism
 Political correctness
 Project-based learning
 Special Assistance Program
 Student-centered learning
 Sudbury model democratic schools
 Sudbury Valley School
 Teaching for social justice
 University reform
 Web literacy

References

Sources

Further reading

 Comer, J.P. (1997). Waiting for a Miracle: Why Schools Can't Solve Our Problems- and How We Can. New York: Penguin Books.
 Cuban, L. (2003). Why Is It So Hard to Get Good Schools? New York: Teachers College, Columbia University.
 Darling-Hammond, Linda. (1997) The Right to Learn: A Blueprint for Creating Schools that Work. Jossey-Bass.
 Dewey, J. and Dewey, E. (1915). Schools of To-morrow. New York: E.P. Dutton and Company.
 
 Gatto, John Taylor (1992). Dumbing Us Down: The Hidden Curriculum of Compulsory Schooling. Canada: New Society Publishers.
 Glazek, S.D. and Sarason, S.B. (2007). Productive Learning: Science, Art, and Einstein's Relativity in Education Reform. New York: Sage Publications, Inc.

 Goodland, J.I. and Anderson, R.H. (1959 and 1987). The Nongraded Elementary School. New York: Harcourt, Brace and Company.

 James, Laurie. (1994) Outrageous Questions: Legacy of Bronson Alcott and America's One-Room Schools New York.
 Katz, M.B. (1971). Class, Bureaucracy, and Schools: The Illusion of Educational Change in America. New York: Praeger Publishers.
 Kliebard, Herbert. (1987) The Struggle for the American Curriculum. New York : Routledge & Kegan Paul.
 Kohn, A. (1999). The Schools Our Children Deserve: Moving Beyond Traditional Classrooms and 'Tougher Standards. Boston: Houghton Mifflin Co.
 Murphy, J.H. and Beck, L.G. (1995). School-Based Management as School Reform: Taking Stock. Thousand Oaks, CA: Corwin Press, Inc.
 Ogbu, J.U. (1978). Minority Education and Caste: The American System in Cross-Cultural Perspective. New York: Academic Press.
 Ravitch, D. (1988). The Great School Wars: A History of the New York City Public Schools. New York: Basic Books, Inc.
 Sarason, S.B. (1996). Revisiting 'The Culture of the School and the Problem of Change. New York: Teachers College Press.
Sarason, S.B. (1990). The Predictable Failure of Educational Reform: Can We Change Course Before Its Too Late? San Francisco: Josey-Bass, Inc.
 Sizer, T.R. (1984). Horace's Compromise: The Dilemma of the American High School. Boston: Houghton Mifflin Company.
 Tough, Paul. (2008). Whatever It Takes: Geoffrey Canada's Quest to Change Harlem and America. New York: Houghton Mifflin Company.
 Tough, Paul. (2012). How Children Succeed. New York: Houghton Mifflin Company.
 Tyack, David and Cuban, Larry. (1995) Tinkering Toward Utopia: A Century of Public School Reform. Cambridge, MA: Harvard University Press.
 Zwaagstra, Michael; Clifton, Rodney; and Long, John. (2010) What's Wrong with Our Schools: and How We Can Fix Them. Rowman & Littlefield.

External links

 
Education issues
History of education